Mene, in ancient Greek religion and Greek mythology, is an epithet of Selene, the Greek lunar goddess as a goddess presiding over the months.

Etymology 
The Greek word  (mēnē) means both the Moon and the lunar month. It represents the feminine form of the older masculine noun  (mēn), which in turn derives from the oblique stem of the Indo-European word *meh1nōt ("moon; month"). The name of the Phrygian moon-god Men derives from the same word. Further cognates include "Moon" and "Máni." 

William Smith writes of Mene as "a goddess presiding over the months". Apostolos Athanassakis and Benjamin Wolkow speculate that Selene's name, which is derived from the word  (selas, "light") and thus means "luminous one", might have originally developed as a euphemism, before becoming the Moon and its goddess's proper name.

See also  
 Proto-Indo-European religion
 Proto-Indo-European language
 H2éwsōs

Notes

References 
 Athanassakis, Apostolos N., and Benjamin M. Wolkow, The Orphic Hymns, Johns Hopkins University Press, 2013. . Google Books.
 
 Hard, Robin, The Routledge Handbook of Greek Mythology: Based on H.J. Rose's "Handbook of Greek Mythology", Psychology Press, 2004, . Google Books.
 Kerényi, Karl (1951), The Gods of the Greeks,  Thames and Hudson, London, 1951. Internet Archive.
 Smith, William; Dictionary of Greek and Roman Biography and Mythology, London (1873). "Mene"

External links 
 MENE/SELENE from the Theoi Project

Selene
Epithets of Greek deities